The Modern Age is the fourth studio album by English Britpop band Sleeper. The album was released in the UK on 22 March 2019, and peaked at number 18 on the UK Album Chart. Three singles were released from this album, "Look At You Now", "The Sun Also Rises" and "More Than I Do", all of which failed to chart.

Critical reception

In a review for the NME, Mark Beaumont stated that The Modern Age had "just enough of the old Smart magic here to satisfy the retro crowds", and gave the record a three-star review.

Track listing

Personnel
Sleeper
 Louise Wener – vocals, guitar
 Jon Stewart – guitar
 Kieron Pepper – bass, Omnichord, ring pull
 Andy MacLure – drums, guitar, piano, keyboards, percussion, programming

Production
 Stephen Street – producer
 Toby May – engineering
 John Davies – mastering

Chart

References 

2019 albums
Sleeper (band) albums
Albums produced by Stephen Street